Scolopterus is a genus of weevils from the family Curculionidae. This genus was first described by Adam White in 1846. The type species for this genus is Scolopterus tetracanthus White, 1846 by original designation. Species from this genus are found in New Zealand.

Species
This genus contains the following species:
 Scolopterus aequus 
 Scolopterus penicillatus 
 Scolopterus tetracanthus

References

Beetles of New Zealand
Endemic fauna of New Zealand
Curculioninae
Endemic insects of New Zealand